Martin Svoboda (born 26 April 1975) is a Czech rowing coxswain. He competed in the men's coxed four event at the 1992 Summer Olympics.

References

1975 births
Living people
Czech male rowers
Olympic rowers of Czechoslovakia
Rowers at the 1992 Summer Olympics
Rowers from Prague
Coxswains (rowing)